Breakaway is the sixth and final studio album recorded by the American female vocal trio First Choice, released in 1980 on the Gold Mind label.

The album includes the title track, which peaked at No. 80 on the Hot Dance/Disco chart. The album was remastered and reissued with bonus tracks in 2013 by Octave Lab Records.

Track listing

Personnel
Rochelle Fleming, Annette Guest, Debbie Martin – vocals
Keith Benson – drums
Jimmy Williams – bass
Eric C. Butler – acoustic piano
Ron Kersey, Carlton "Cotton" Kent, T.G. Conway, Eugene Curry – keyboards
Norman Harris, Bobby Eli, T.J. Tindall, Dennis Harris, Edward Moore, James Turner, Richard Adderly – guitars
Larry Washington, Ron Tyson – congas
Melvin Steals, Mervin Steals, Richard Adderly – percussion
George Bussey – saxophone
Richard Adderly – vibes
Don Renaldo – strings, horns

Charts
Singles

References

External links
 

1980 albums
First Choice (band) albums
Albums produced by Norman Harris
Albums recorded at Sigma Sound Studios
Gold Mind Records albums